The Women's sprint competition at the 2020 UCI Track Cycling World Championships was held on 27 and 28 February 2020.

Results

Qualifying
The qualifying was started on 27 February at 14:53. The top four riders advanced directly to the 1/8 finals; places 5 to 28 advanced to the 1/16 finals.

1/16 finals
The 1/16 finals were started on 27 February at 15:58. Heat winners advanced to the 1/8 finals.

1/8 finals
The 1/8 finals were started on 27 February at 16:50. Heat winners advanced to the quarterfinals.

Quarterfinals
The quarterfinals were started 27 February at 18:58. Matches were extended to a best-of-three format hereon; winners proceeded to the semifinals.

Semifinals
The semifinals were started on 28 February at 19:24.

Finals
The finals were started on 28 February at 20:51.

References

Women's sprint
UCI Track Cycling World Championships – Women's sprint